Kushk-e Pas Qalat (also Romanized as Kūshk-e Pas Qalāt) is a village in Famur Rural District, Jereh and Baladeh District, Kazerun County, Fars Province, Iran. At the 2006 census, its population was 34, in 5 families.

References 

Populated places in Kazerun County